Jamie Bestwick (born 8 July 1971 in Nottingham, United Kingdom) is a British BMX rider. He won 13 gold medals in the BMX Vert event at the X Games, and one gold medal for Vert Best Trick.

He started riding BMX with his friends at 10 years old. Jamie only competed in BMX events for fun. Riding his bike was just a way to hang out with his friends. After he finished school, his first priority was working as an engineer for Rolls-Royce in England and he thought that was going to be his career. However, he decided to quit his job and become a professional BMX rider.

Jamie competed in his first X Games in 1996. He ended Dave Mirra’s BMX three-year Vert reign in 2000, taking home the gold. He gradually became unbeatable. He won every single competition he entered in 2005. He won silver at X Games 2015, losing after winning 9 years in a row 

Bestwick has also won a Laureus World Sports Award for Action Sportsperson of the Year and been nominated for a Best Male Action Sports Athlete ESPY Award. In 2014, Bestwick spoke at Yale University alongside Ken Hill, Scott Russell, and Nick Ienatsch about motorcycle racing and success. In 2006 he performed in Cirque Rocks a charity circus held in New Zealand.

He acted as coach to Charlotte Worthington when she won the gold medal at the 2020 Summer Olympics and Declan Brooks when he won Bronze Medal at the 2020 Summer Olympics.

References

1971 births
Living people
BMX riders
Sportspeople from Nottingham
Laureus World Sports Awards winners